XO is the fourth studio album by American singer-songwriter Elliott Smith. It was recorded from 1997 to 1998 and released on August 25, 1998, by record label DreamWorks; Smith's first solo album on a major record label. Two singles, "Waltz #2 (XO)" and "Baby Britain", were released.

Recording 

Early sessions for the album began at Larry Crane's Jackpot Recording Studio after the release of Either/Or in 1997. These sessions would yield early demos of several album tracks, as well as outtakes later released posthumously on New Moon. Work began in earnest on the album in early 1998, after Smith traveled to Los Angeles to work with producers Rob Schnapf and Tom Rothrock. An early working title for the album was Grand Mal.

The title of the first track, "Sweet Adeline", was inspired by Smith's recollections of his grandmother singing in her glee club, Sweet Adelines International. "Amity" is believed to be named after a friend who can be seen in photographs from Smith's 1997 tour. "Everybody Cares, Everybody Understands" is based on a true story of an intervention that saw Smith check into a rehab facility in Arizona. Smith's original lyrics bear this out further, with references to 'the desert', a 'dream-killing doctor', and a 'twelve-stepping cop'.

Release 

XO was released by DreamWorks Records on August 25, 1998. It was Smith's first solo record on a major record label, though he had previously released music on a major label with his band Heatmiser's final album, Mic City Sons (1996).

Singles released from the album were "Waltz #2 (XO)" in the same year and "Baby Britain" the following year.

Reception 

XO was well received by critics upon its release. Mark Richardson of Pitchfork wrote, "Smith's songwriting continues to improve, as each of [the album's] fourteen tracks displays his inarguable mastery of the pop song structure more clearly than ever." Robert Christgau of The Village Voice gave the album a one-star honorable mention rating, indicating "a worthy effort consumers attuned to its overriding aesthetic or individual vision may well like". His review described the album's music as "high tune, low affect," citing "Waltz #2 (XO)" and "Everybody Cares, Everybody Understands" as highlights. XO placed at number five on The Village Voices 1998 end-of-year Pazz & Jop poll.

In its retrospective review, BBC Music wrote, "the budget might have gone up, but Smith's masterful way with an understated melody and melancholic lyric remained firmly intact", calling XO "perhaps the greatest long-player Smith released; if not, it's certainly the equal of the preceding Either/Or. Repeat listens don't dull it in the slightest, every barbed one-liner and exhalation of despair perfectly preserved". Trouser Press called the record "a tastefully commercialized production (completely with horns and strings) that respects Smith's privacy and, in fact, does him a solid service. [...] If the songs are not the most profound or developed of Smith's catalogue, it's still a great record that proves how durable integrity can be."

 Legacy 

In 2010, Spin magazine placed XO at number 90 on its list of the 125 best albums in the magazine's lifetime. Pitchfork Media placed the album at number 68 in their list of the greatest albums of the 1990s.

Matthew LeMay has written a book about XO as part of the 33⅓ series of books on albums, released on April 6, 2009, by the Continuum International Publishing Group.

RJD2 sampled "I Didn't Understand" on the song "Ghostwriter" on his album Deadringer. Indie rock band Grandaddy performed "Oh Well, Okay" live in 2012 as a tribute to Smith.

 Track listing 

 Personnel 

 Elliott Smith – guitar, vocals, piano, bass guitar, drums, organ, mandolin, electric piano, melodica, percussion, string and horn arrangements, record producer, recording (all tracks except 4 and 9)Additional personnel Rob Schnapf – guitar ("Baby Britain"), production, recording (all tracks except 4 and 9)
 Paul Pulvirenti – drums on "Baby Britain"
 Tom Rothrock – drum programming ("Independence Day"), production, recording (all tracks except 4 and 9)
 Joey Waronker – drums ("Bled White", "Bottle Up and Explode!")
 Jon Brion – vibraphone and Chamberlin ("Waltz #1", "Bottle Up and Explode!", "Everybody Cares, Everybody Understands")
 R. James Atkinson – French horn on "Oh Well, Okay"
 Bruce Eskovitz – bass saxophone, baritone saxophone on "A Question Mark", flute on "Everybody Cares, Everybody Understands"
 Roy Poper – trumpet on "Everybody Cares, Everybody Understands"
 Shelly Berg – string and horn arrangements
 Tom Halm – string and horn arrangements
 Farhad Behroozi – strings
 Henry Ferber – strings
 Jerrod Goodman – strings
 Pamela DeAlmeida – strings
 Peter Hatch – strings
 Raymond Tischer II – strings
 Russel Cantor – strings
 Waldemar DeAlmeida – stringsTechnical'

 Alex Sanderson – engineering assistance
 Doug Boehm – engineering assistance
 Richard Barron – engineering assistance
 Stephen Marcussen – mastering
 Larry Crane – recording (tracks 4 and 9)
 Johnson and Wolverton – sleeve artwork
 Eric Matthies – sleeve photography

Charts

Album

Singles

Certifications

References

Further reading

External links 

 

Elliott Smith albums
1998 albums
Albums produced by Tom Rothrock
Albums produced by Rob Schnapf
DreamWorks Records albums
Art pop albums